Reagan County is a county on the Edwards Plateau in the U.S. state of Texas. As of the 2010 census, its population was 3,385. The county seat is Big Lake. The county is named after John Henninger Reagan (1818-1905), who was the postmaster general of the Confederate States and also a U.S. senator, U.S. representative, and first chairman of the Railroad Commission of Texas.

History

The region was first inhabited by Paleo-Indian, Suma-Jumano, Kiowa and Comanche peoples. Captains Hernán Martín and Diego del Castillo explored the region in 1650.In 1684, Juan Domínguez de Mendoza and Nicolás López reported on local indigenous groups.

Butterfield Overland Mail, which operated from 1858 to 1861, crossed through the center of the county. In 1878, Camp Grierson's Spring was established as a subpost of Fort Concho and named in honor of Col. Benjamin H. Grierson.

In 1903, Reagan County was carved from Tom Green County and named for United States Senator John Henninger Reagan. Stiles, named after local rancher William G. Stiles, became the first county seat. The Kansas City, Mexico and Orient of Texas Railway was completed in 1911.

In 1923, oil was discovered at the Big Lake Oilfield in the Permian Basin. Big Lake Oilfield, located on University of Texas System land, opened the Permian Basin to oil production and endowed the Permanent University Fund. The rig was named Santa Rita #1 for The Patron Saint of the Impossible. Big Lake was incorporated as a city. In 1924, shortly after the oil boom, the town community of Best plunged into vice and violence, necessitating the intervention of the Texas Rangers. The Rangers destroyed buildings that were being used as brothels, gambling houses, and saloons.In 1925, the county seat was moved to Big Lake by a vote. The following year, the Big Lake Oil Company established Texon for its employees and their families, with a devotion to family life.

In 1951, there was a renewed oil boom from production in the Spraberry Trend.

Geography
The Spraberry Trend, the third-largest oil field in the United States by remaining reserves, underlies much of the county.

Major highways
  U.S. Highway 67
  State Highway 137
  Ranch to Market Road 33

Adjacent counties
 Glasscock County (north)
 Sterling County (northeast)
 Tom Green County (east)
 Irion County (east)
 Crockett County (south)
 Upton County (west)
 Midland County (northwest)

Demographics

Note: the US Census treats Hispanic/Latino as an ethnic category. This table excludes Latinos from the racial categories and assigns them to a separate category. Hispanics/Latinos can be of any race.

As of the census of 2000, 3,326 people, 1,107 households, and 872 families were residing in the county. The racial makeup of the county was 64.64% White, 3.01% African American, 0.54% Native American, 0.27% Asian, 29.56% from other races, and 1.98% from two or more races. About 49.49% of the population were Hispanics or Latinos of any race.

Of the1,107 households, 46.8% had children under 18 living with them, 68.1% were married couples living together, 7.2% had a female householder with no husband present, and 21.2% were not families. About 19.8% of all households were made up of individuals, and 7.5% had someone living alone who was 65  or older. The average household size was 2.96, and the average family size was 3.42.

In the county, the age distribution was 34.2% under 18, 7.6% from 18 to 24, 28.1% from 25 to 44, 19.9% from 45 to 64, and 10.3% who were 65 or older. The median age was 32 years. For every 100 females, there were 100.50 males. For every 100 females 18 and over, there were 100.50 males.

The median income for a household in the county was $33,231, and for a family was $36,806. Males had a median income of $31,228 versus $18,750 for females. The per capita income for the county was $13,174. About 9.3% of families and 11.8% of the population were below the poverty line, including 10.6% of those under age 18 and 23.6% of those age 65 or over.

Communities

City
 Big Lake (county seat)

Unincorporated communities
 Best
 Texon

Ghost town
 Stiles

Politics

See also

 List of Recorded Texas Historic Landmarks in Reagan County
 National Register of Historic Places listings in Reagan County, Texas

References

External links
 
 "Reagan County Profile" from the "Texas Association of Counties"

 
1903 establishments in Texas
Populated places established in 1903
Majority-minority counties in Texas